Elio De Silvestro (born 10 March 1993) is an Italian footballer who plays as a support striker.

Club career

Juventus
A key part of the 2011–12 Primavera squad for Juventus, De Silvestro was promoted to the senior squad prior to the 2012–13 Serie A campaign. He took part in Juventus' pre-season camp and also played in several pre-season matches, including the 2011 American tour.

Pro Vercelli
On 22 August 2012, De Silvestro was sold in a co-ownership deal to Pro Vercelli for €800,000 as part of the deal that saw Alberto Masi transfer outright to Juventus. De Silvestro was player of Pro Vercelli for the 2012–13 Serie B season. With the Serie B outfit, De Silvestro made his professional debut on 25 August 2012, coming on as an 84th-minute substitute in a 1–0 home victory over Ternana Calcio during league play. He went on to make 19 league appearances for the club, scoring his first career goal on 9 September 2012 in a 1–2 home loss to A.S. Livorno.

On 5 July 2013, Juventus completed a triple-deal with Pro Vercelli that saw De Silvestro return to Turin permanently for €760,000 while the recently relegated Lega Pro Prima Divisione outfit secured the co-ownership signings of Giuseppe Ruggiero and Nazzareno Belfasti for €470,000 and €260,000 respectively.

Reggiana (loan)
On 2 September 2013, De Silvestro was officially sold on a temporary basis to Reggiana.

Carpi (loan)
De Silvestro joined Serie B side Carpi on loan for the 2014–15 season.

Lanciano 
On 22 January 2015 De Silvestro moved to Lanciano for €1.2 million, with Laurențiu Brănescu returned to Juventus for the same fee. De Silvestro wore no.15 which left vacated by Pasquale De Vita. In January 2016 De Silvestro was loaned to Pavia.

Ancona
In July 2016 De Silvestro was signed by U.S. Ancona 1905. He wore number 11 shirt.

Juve Stabia
On 31 January 2022, De Silvestro joined Juve Stabia on loan.

International career
De Silvestro has represented his country at the Italy U-16, Italy U-17, Italy U-18, Italy U-19, Italy U-20, and Italy U-21 international levels. In all, he has earned 31 international caps, scoring 4 goals.

References

External links
 tuttomercatoweb.com
 goal.com
 
 

1993 births
Living people
People from Formia
Footballers from Turin
Italian footballers
Association football forwards
Serie B players
Serie C players
F.C. Pro Vercelli 1892 players
Juventus F.C. players
A.C. Reggiana 1919 players
A.C. Carpi players
S.S. Virtus Lanciano 1924 players
F.C. Pavia players
U.S. Ancona 1905 players
Siracusa Calcio players
A.S. Gubbio 1910 players
U.S. Grosseto 1912 players
S.S. Juve Stabia players
Italy youth international footballers
Footballers from Lazio
Sportspeople from the Province of Latina